Kadalaiyur is a rural village located in the Ettayapuram taluka of the Thoothukkudi district in the state of Tamil Nadu, India. It is situated 10 km away from sub-district headquarter Ettayapuram and 55 km away from district headquarter Thoothukkudi. As per 2009 stats, Kadalaiyur village is also a gram panchayat. The location code of the village is 642260.

Kadalaiyur has a total geographical area of 909.62 hectares.

Demographics
Based on the 2011 census info, Kadalaiyur has a total population of 3,857 people living in approximately 1,139 households. The male to female ratio is approximately 1:1.

Approximately 1,977 individuals within the total population are workers. Approximately 403 are children aged 0–6 years.

Transportation 
Kadalaiyur has access to both public and private bus services. Additionally, there is a railway station located 5–10 km from the village.

Education
The literacy rate of Kadalaiyur village is approximately 80.49%. This is slightly higher than Tamil Nadu's overall average of 80.09%. The literacy rate for males is approximately 88.40% while the literacy rate for females is slightly lower at about 72.60%.

Nearby Colleges and Universities

 Tamil Nadu Agricultural University, Black Soil Farm
 Punitha Ohm College of Education
 Lakshmi Ammal Polytechnic College
 KR College of Arts & Science
 Unnamalal Institute of Technology
 G.Venkataswamy Naidu College
 SDM Arts & Science College

Nearby Schools 

Sengunthar High School
TDTA Middle School

References

Cities and towns in Thoothukudi district
Thoothukudi district